The 1984 Giro del Trentino was the eighth edition of the Tour of the Alps cycle race and was held on 7 May to 10 May 1984. The race started in Folgaria and finished in Trento. The race was won by Franco Chioccioli.

General classification

References

1984
May 1984 sports events in Europe
1984 in road cycling
1984 in Italian sport